"Love Is Like a Violin" is a song by Irish band Tír na nÓg. It was released in early April 1985 as a single, with a new version of "Daisy Lady" as its B-side to coincide with a 14-date Irish tour after the reunification of the band. The tour ended on April 21 at the Olympia Theatre in Dublin.

Format and track listing
Ireland stereo 7" single (TIR 1)
"Love Is Like a Violin" (Leo O'Kelly)
"Daisy Lady" (O'Kelly)

Personnel
Sonny Condell - vocals, guitar
Leo O'Kelly - vocals, guitar
Shay Fitz - engineering

References

1985 singles
Tír na nÓg (band) songs
1985 songs